Robert "King" Carter (4 August 1663 – 4 August 1732) was a merchant, planter and powerful politician in colonial Virginia. Born in Lancaster County, Carter eventually became one of the richest men in the Thirteen Colonies. As President of the Virginia Governor's Council, Carter served as the royal governor of Virginia from 1726 to 1727 after the previous governor, Hugh Drysdale, died in office. He acquired the moniker "King" from fellow Virginians in his lifetime connoting his wealth, autocratic business methods and political power. Carter also served as the colony's Treasurer, many terms in the House of Burgesses and twice fellow members elected him as their Speaker.

Early life and education 
Robert "King" Carter was born in 1662 at Corotoman Plantation in Lancaster County, Virginia, to John Carter, Sr. (1613–1669) of London, England, and his fourth wife, Sarah Ludlow (1635–1668) of Maiden Bradley, Wiltshire, who immigrated to the colony of Virginia, but died soon after the birth. His father had survived three previous wives, so young Robert had an elder step-brother, John, who under primogeniture inherited most of their father's estate in 1669, and was responsible for executing the provisions of their father's will. John Carter, Jr.  also followed the instructions in their father's will and sent the orphaned Robert to England to be educated. Thus he lived in London with Arthur Bailey, a tobacco merchant who handled the family's tobacco, for six years and learned the transatlantic tobacco trade.

Robert Carter probably lived at Corotoman plantation with his elder half-brother and wife upon returning to Virginia. In 1690 Robert Carter increased his landholdings from his father following his elder half brother's death without male issue (and widow's remarriage and death, as well as managed his niece's property until her marriage and death also shortly thereafter). Carter also increased his landholdings through purchase, by foreclosing mortgages, and by his own advantageous marriages. In 1688, he married his first wife, Judith Armistead of "Hesse" plantation—then in Gloucester County, but which after boundary changes in 1691 became (and is now in) Mathews County. They had five children, of whom three survived infancy, including John, as elaborated below. After her death in 1699, Carter married the wealthy widow Elizabeth Landon Willis in 1701. She bore five daughters and five sons, seven of whom reached adulthood, as elaborated below. King Carter had each of his sons educated in England, and his firstborn son John like his long-dead uncle John saw to the education and marriage of his half-siblings, including those youngest underage after their father's death. Meanwhile, King Carter worked with his eldest on the family business, and endowed each of his sons who reached marriageable age in his lifetime with significant plantations. Robert Carter II (1704-1732) whom his father called "Robin" would die of a sudden illness months before his father, but his Nomini Hall plantation was inherited by his son, Robert Carter III (1728-1804), who like his grandfather served on the Governor's Council. Charles Carter (1707-1764) would exchange the land he had inherited for other property and built Cleve Hall in King George County, which he represented for many years in the House of Burgesses. Landon Carter received Sabine Hall from his father and represented Richmond County in the House of Burgesses, as well as (in 1742) inherited some of property from his elder half brother John, and served as guardian for those underage nephews Charles Hill Carter, Edward Hill Carter and Robert Carter Nicholas, all of whom would later serve in the Virginia General Assembly. Another brother, George Carter, remained in England, where he practiced law but did not marry (nor take possession of his Virginia inheritance) before his death in 1642.

Career 

At age 28, shortly after his elder half-brother died Robert Carter entered the General Assembly of Virginia as a Burgess representing Lancaster County. He would serve part-time in 1690–1691, and then for five consecutive years (1695 through 1699) before being promoted (by the British Privy Council on the recommendation of Governor Francis Nicholson) to the Governor's Council (also the higher chamber of the Virginia General Assembly). While in the House of Burgesses, Carter served on two important committees (for Elections and Privileges and for Examination of Propositions and Grievances). In the session which began in September 1696, Carter defeated four other burgesses for the position of Speaker, and also served as Speaker for the October 1687 session, but was not re-elected in a five-candidate field in September 1698. However, the House of Burgesses appointed him as the colony's treasurer, thus giving him responsibility of monies raised by assembly-levied taxes in the colony, and assembly-mandated spending. Meanwhile, Carter also became a vestryman of Lancaster County's Christ Church Parish in 1690, and the following year became one of the justices of the peace for Lancaster County (the justices jointly in that era also administering the county, with social services provided by the vestry). He would also command the militias of Lancaster and adjacent Northumberland Counties, and secured appointment as the naval officer of the Rappahannock River region (which secured customs duties).

Ultimately, Carter would become as influential a member of the Governor's Council as he had been in the colony's legislature. He was among the majority of Councillors who opposed Nicholson in 1704, which led indirectly to that governor's dismissal. A decade later, in the controversy between resident Lieutenant Governor Alexander Spotswood and the great planters, Carter sided with his fellow planters opposing Spotswood. After the death of Governor Hugh Drysdale in 1726, as the council's President (by seniority after the death of Edmund Jenings and despite his own poor health), Carter served as acting Governor of Virginia until Lieutenant Governor William Gooch took office on 11 September 1727. Carter continued to attend Council meetings until the General Assembly adjourned on 1 July 1732, five weeks until his death.
Meanwhile, much of Carter's land acquisition was as the Virginia resident land agent of Thomas Fairfax, 5th Lord Fairfax of Cameron – known simply as Lord Fairfax. Carter served two terms totaling nearly 20 years, as agent for the Fairfax Proprietary of the Northern Neck of Virginia, essentially the land between the Potomac and Rappahannock Rivers westward to the Blue Ridge Mountains. Beginning in his first term, 1702–1711, Carter had his surveyors find the best land, which he patented in his own names as well as in the names of his children, first in the drainage of Rappahannock River, and later the area drained by the Potomac River. The latter was a cousin of the Lords Culpeper, from whom the Fairfaxes had inherited their Virginia holdings.
Much of the land was divided into farms and cultivated using enslaved labor and overseers. Tobacco was the primary cash crop, but the farms also produced beans, corn and wheat, as well as cattle and hogs for domestic consumption. Other enterprises in which Carter engaged included sloops and flatboats, and he also acted as agent for slave traders.
Carter built a large house at Corotoman in 1725, then saw it burn four years later, but did not rebuild it before he died a four years later. He also suffered from gout.

Death and legacy 
Carter died on 4 August 1732, in Lancaster County, Virginia. He was buried there at Christ Church. He left his family 300,000 acres (1,200 km2) of land; 3,000 slaves, counted as personal property; and £10,000 in cash, as stated in the academic genealogical study, A Genealogy of the Known Descendants of Robert Carter of Corotoman (1982), written by Florence Tyler Carlton.  Some of the papers of his family held by the University of Virginia Library are available in digital form.

When Lord Fairfax saw Carter's obituary in the London monthly The Gentleman's Magazine, he was astonished to read of the immense personal wealth acquired by his resident land agent. Rather than name another Virginian to the position, Fairfax made arrangements to have his cousin, Colonel William Fairfax, move to Virginia to act as land agent, with the paid position of customs inspector (tax collector) for the Potomac River district. Fairfax himself then visited his vast Northern Neck Proprietary from 1735 to 1737, and he moved there permanently in 1747.

Descendants
Carter had five children with his first wife, Judith Armistead:
Sarah Carter (born ~1690, died in infancy)
Elizabeth Carter (~1692-1734) married Nathaniel Burwell in 1709, then George Nicholas.
Judith Carter (born ~1694) died in infancy before her mother and buried near her at Christ Church
Judith Carter (1695–1750) married Mann Page (1691-1730) of Rosewell plantation in 1718.
John Carter (1696–1742) married Elizabeth Hill of Shirley Plantation

Carter had ten children with his second wife, Betty Landon Willis (1684-1719), of whom seven reached adulthood:
Anne Carter (1702–1743) married Benjamin Harrison IV; (parents of Benjamin Harrison V and grandparents of President William Henry Harrison).
Robert Carter II (1704–1732) married Priscilla Churchill, and died four months before his father.
Sarah Carter (~1705–1705)
Betty Carter (~1705–1706)
Charles Carter (1707–1764) married Mary Walker, then Anne Byrd (daughter of Col. William Byrd II), then Lucy Taliaferro (who survived him).
Ludlow Carter (born ~1709, died as child)
Landon Carter (1710–1778) married Maria Byrd, daughter of Col. William Byrd II.
Mary Carter (1712–1736) married George Braxton; (parents of Carter Braxton).
Lucy Carter (1715–1763) married Henry Fitzhugh
George Carter (1718–1742)

Other notable descendants include:

Carter Braxton, grandson, signer of Declaration of Independence
Robert Burwell (1720-1777), grandson, member of the House of Burgesses
Charles Carter (of Ludlow) (1732-1796), grandson, burgess, delegate, member of the Governor's council
Charles Hill Carter (1732-1806), grandson, planter (at Shirley plantation) and burgess
Charles Carter, Jr. (burgess), grandson, planter and burgess
Robert Carter III (1727–1804), grandson, member of the Governor's council
Talcott Eliason (1826–1896), J.E.B. Stuart's Field Surgeon during the Civil War;
Robert E. Lee (1807–1870), Confederate States Army general.
Robert Randolph Carter (1825-1888), Confederate States Army first lieutenant
John Page (1743–1808), 13th Governor of Virginia.
Mann Page (1749–1781), Virginia delegate to the Continental Congress in 1777
Thomas Nelson Page (1853–1922), US ambassador to Italy during the Woodrow Wilson administration.
William Nelson Page (1854–1932), American civil engineer and industrialist.
James "Gentleman Jim" Robinson, one of the wealthiest African Americans in the Manassas area. His homestead was located between the lines of the Confederate and Union armies during two major battles of the Civil War.

See also 

 Robert Carter III
 Carter's Grove Plantation
 Corotoman Plantation
 Rosewell Plantation
 Shirley Plantation
 Christ Church
 History of slavery in the United States

References

External links 

 Robert Carter I at Encyclopedia Virginia
 Nomini Hall Plantation
 Robert Carter I at Christ Church
 Paweł Konieczny, Korespondencja Roberta „Króla” Cartera jako źródło do badań nad mentalnością elity osiemnastowiecznej Wirginii

1663 births
1732 deaths
18th-century American landowners
American landowners
American people of English descent
American planters
American real estate businesspeople
American slave owners
American slave traders
Robert I
Colonial governors of Virginia
People from Lancaster County, Virginia
Speakers of the Virginia House of Burgesses
Virginia Governor's Council members